Dr. Zahara Nampewo, is a female Ugandan lawyer, human rights activist, and academic. She is the executive director of the Human Rights and Peace Centre (HURIPEC) at Makerere University School of Law, in Kampala, Uganda's capital and largest city.

Background and education
Zahara Nampewo has a long list of academic qualifications both in the law and in the human rights arenas. She holds a Bachelor of Laws from Makerere University, in Kampala, Uganda's capital and largest city. She also holds a Diploma in Legal Practice, obtained from the Law Development Centre, also in Kampala.

Her Advanced Diploma in Human Rights Protection was obtained from Abo Akademi University, in Turku, Finland. She also has a Master of Laws degree, in human rights, awarded by the University of Nottingham in the United Kingdom. Her Doctor of Juridical Science degree was obtained from Emory University in Atlanta, Georgia, United States.

Career
Prior to joining the Makerere University faculty in 2006, she worked as a senior legal officer with the Foundation for Human Rights Initiative (FHRI), a human rights advocacy non-profit organisation, based in Nsambya, a neighborhood within Kampala. She also worked as a specialist in gender-based justice at the United Nations Development Fund for Women, in Liberia. Immediately before joining Makerere, she worked for the Danish International Development Agency (DANIDA), as a coordinator of their Access to Justice programme.

At Makerere University, Nampewo teaches law and heads HURIPEC, a component of the School of Law. She specializes in human rights and gender rights and teaches Conflict Resolution, International Humanitarian Law, Gender Law, Health Law, and Family Law. She has published considerably in peer journals on the subject and on related topics.

Other considerations
Dr. Zahara Nampewo is a director at the Governance and Public Policy Research Center, a think tank, based in Kampala, Uganda.

See also
Sylvia Tamale
Sarah Ssali
Barbara Ntambirweki

References

External links
 Website of the Human Rights and Peace Centre (HURIPEC)
 Scholars expose massive flaws in land commission As of 13 November 2017.

Living people
Ganda people
21st-century Ugandan lawyers
Ugandan women lawyers
Year of birth missing (living people)
Ugandan Muslims
Ugandan activists
Ugandan women activists
Makerere University alumni
Academic staff of Makerere University
Law Development Centre alumni
Åbo Akademi University alumni
Alumni of the University of Nottingham
Emory University alumni
People from Central Region, Uganda
Ugandan women academics